The 2019 NASCAR Whelen Euro Series is the eleventh Racecar Euro Series season, and the seventh under the NASCAR Whelen Euro Series branding. Alon Day and Ulysse Delsaux entered the season as the defending champion in the Elite 1 and Elite 2 category respectively, however Delsaux will not defend his title as he will move up to Elite 1 for the 2019 season.

In the Elite 1 class, Loris Hezemans wins his first Elite 1 title, winning the championship by 49 points over PK Carsport driver Stienes Longin. In the Elite 2 class, despite not starting every race of the season, Lasse Sørensen won the title after he scored 7 race wins and finishing in the podium in all but one of his 11 starts. Sørensen and Giorgio Maggi arrived to the final race of the season at Circuit Zolder with only one point separating them in the championship, and Sørensen would finish ahead of Maggi in the race to win the title by 9 points. Hendriks Motorsport, represented by the No. 50 team of Hezemans and Maggi, won the Team's Championship title by 112 points from PK Carsport's No. 24 team.

Teams and drivers
NASCAR released the 33-car entry list for the teams participating on 25 March 2019.

Elite 1

Elite 2

Notes

Driver changes
Former Cup Series driver, 1995 Indianapolis 500 winner and 1997 Formula One champion Jacques Villeneuve is set to make his Euro Series debut for Go Fas Racing in the Elite 1 class, replacing Romain Iannetta who switched teams to Racing Engineering.
DTM's only female race winner Ellen Lohr is set to make her Euro Series debut for Dexwet-df1 Racing in the Elite 1 class. She will drive the #99 car, which was driven by Advait Deodhar in the Elite 2 class last season. Deodhar himself will stay with the team as he will make his first full-season campaign in the Elite 2 class with the #66 team for the 2019 season.
Justin Kunz will make a switch from Racing Total to Dexwet-df1 Racing for 2019.
Defending Elite 2 champion Ulysse Delsaux will move up to the Elite 1 class to drive the No. 36 RDV Competition entry, replacing Bobby Labonte who moved to Mishumotors to drive the No. 70 Camaro.
2016 Mini Challenge UK Cooper S Class champion Scott Jeffs will make his Euro Series for Braxx Racing in the Elite 2 class. He will partner with Alex Sedgwick in the No. 90 entry for the 2019 season.
Pierluigi Veronesi will make a switch from BVR Motorsport to Alex Caffi Motorsport for 2019.
Jesse Vartiainen is scheduled to make his Euro Series debut for Alex Caffi Motorsport in the No. 2 Elite 2 entry. He previously made an appearance at the Hockenheim round last season for Caffi.
Ben Creanor is scheduled to make his Euro Series debut in the No. 33 Elite 2 entry for Mishumotors.
Shaun Hollamby, the owner of BTCC team AmD Essex, is scheduled to make his Euro Series debut in the No. 46 Elite 2 entry for Racing Total, replacing the departing Justin Kunz.
Martin Doubek will compete in both classes again for 2019 after competing in the Elite 1 class only in 2018.
Giorgio Maggi will move from ADAC GT Masters to make his debut in the NASCAR Whelen Euro Series. Maggi will drive the No. 50 Elite 2 entry for Hendriks Motorsport.
Thomas Ferrando will switch teams to Alex Caffi Motorsport after Knauf Racing folded in the off-season. Ferrando will drive the No. 27 Elite 1 entry for the 2019 season.
2018 NASCAR PEAK Mexico Series champion Rubén García Jr. is scheduled to make his Euro Series debut in the season opening round at Valencia as part of a driver exchange program between Euro Series and Mexico Series.
Ander Vilariño returns to the series after a three-year absence. He will drive Racing Engineering's No. 48 car on a full-time basis.
Jennifer Jo Cobb is scheduled to compete for the majority of the season in the No. 10 Racing-Total car in the Elite 2 class. Due to a clash in schedule with the NASCAR Gander Outdoors Truck Series, Jo Cobb is currently not listed to take part in Franciacorta and Most, although she is currently in talks with the team for a chance to compete in all Euro Series races.
2018 Mini Challenge UK champion Ant Whorton-Eales is scheduled to make his Euro Series debut with the No. 46 Racing-Total team in Elite 1.
Tom Boonen, Niels Albert, and Bert Longin was initially announced to share a ride in the No. 11 PK Carsport car in Elite 2 for 2019. Freddy Nordström and Vittorio Ghirelli would also race for the No. 11 team at Brands Hatch and Most respectively, while Niels Albert would be replaced by Barry Maessen on Albert's scheduled debut at Venray.
Naveh Talor is scheduled to make his Euro Series debut with Solaris Motorsport in the Elite 2 class.
Fredrik Hemborg is scheduled to make his Euro Series debut in Memphis Racing's No. 77 Camaro. Hemborg will replace Guillaume Deflandre in the team's Elite 2 seat.
Henri Tuomaala and Ian Eric Wadén are scheduled to make their first full season Euro Series campaign in 2019 with the No. 23 Camaro of Memphis Racing.
ThorSport Racing driver and 2018 NASCAR Camping World Truck Series Rookie of the Year Myatt Snider will make his Euro Series debut this season, driving Racing Engineering's No. 48 Mustang in the Elite 2 class in conjunction with his part-time Truck Series effort.
Braxx Racing team owner Jerry de Weerdt will step down from the No. 78 Ford seat in the Elite 1 class to focus on his Elite 2 class campaign. Marc Goossens will replace him in the No. 78 Elite 1 seat.
Nicolò Rocca is scheduled to make a return to full-time racing in 2019 with PK Carsport. Rocca will replace Anthony Kumpen, who is currently suspended due to failing a drug test during the 2018 24 Hours of Zolder. Partnering with Rocca in the No. 24 seat will be former USF2000 driver Andre Castro, who will make his Euro Series debut this season. Kumpen himself would eventually move to a management role in PK Carsport as he currently works as the team manager for the Euro Series operations of the team.

Team changes
Solaris Motorsport will field a car in the Elite 2 class for Israeli driver Naveh Talor in the 2019 season. They previously fielded the No. 12 car in the Elite 1 class only.
DF1 Racing's #99 car is set to run as a full-time team in 2019. The #99 car was run as a part-time Elite 2 class effort in 2018, with Advait Deodhar driving the car in Brands Hatch and Hockenheim.
Team Bleekemolen will enter the championship with the No. 69 Mustang for father and son duo Michael and Sebastiaan Bleekemolen. The team also potentially will field a second car if the team can earn enough sponsorship money.
RDV Competition's No. 18 entry will be renumbered to the No. 36. In addition, the No. 36 entry will use a Chevrolet Camaro chassis instead of a Toyota Camry chassis.
Alex Caffi Motorsport will expand into a three-car team with the addition of the #27 Mustang to the team after signing a collaboration deal with BVR Motorsport, who fielded the No. 27 team last season.
Hendriks Motorsport will expand into a two-car team with the addition of the No. 7 Mustang to the team for 2019. The No. 7 team was part of the Belgium Driver Academy team in the 2018 season.
CAAL Racing will downsize to a two-car team, shutting down the No. 44 and No. 56 team and adding the No. 31 team following a merger between CAAL and Race Art - Blu Mot, who fielded the No. 31 team in the 2018 season.
Former Formula 2 and European Le Mans Series team Racing Engineering will make their debut in the series. The team will field the No. 48 and No. 88 Mustang for the 2019 season.
Eric De Doncker's Motorsport 98 returns to the series after a one-year absence.
Memphis Racing will expand into a two-car team with the addition of the No. 23 Camaro.
Racers Motorsport will field a third entry with the No. 19 team for the 2019 season. They initially planned to field a third entry in 2018, but ultimately the team would field only two cars.
Lucas Lasserre's Speedhouse 64 will make their debut in the series, fielding the No. 64 car for the 2019 season.
Braxx Racing will downsize from a three-car team into a two-car team after the team shut down the No. 91 entry.
Both Jennifer Jo Cobb Racing and AmD Tuning entered a partnership with Racing-Total for the 2019 season.
Mishumotors' No. 70 team is set to run full-time in 2019 after the team ran part-time in 2018.
Knauf Racing did not submit an entry for the 2019 season. It is presumed that the team folded in the off-season.

Mid-season changes
Starting from the rounds at Franciacorta, Lasse Sørensen will be driving for the No. 66 Dexwet-df1 Racing team in the Elite 2 class, replacing Advait Deodhar who moved to Speedhouse 64 for Franciacorta before switching teams again to CAAL Racing starting from Brands Hatch onwards.
On May 14, it was announced that Christophe Bouchut had parted ways from Dexwet-df1 Racing after the Saturday race at Franciacorta, citing personal issues as the cause of leave.
On May 18, it was announced that Racing-Total's NASCAR Whelen Euro Series operations will be rebranded to Marko Stipp Motorsport. Marko Stipp Motorsport will continue the partnership that Racing-Total had with AmD Tuning.
During the race week at Most, the No. 27 entry switched teams from Alex Caffi Motorsport to CAAL Racing for the rest of the season. On the same race week, Florian Venturi left Go Fas Racing citing a disagreement between him and team boss Alain Lord Mounir as the cause of leave as Vittorio Ghirelli switched teams from Racers Motorsport to PK Carsport, replacing Andre Castro in the No. 24 team starting from Venray. Castro would move to Marko Stipp Motorsport to drive in the No. 46 team for the rest of the season.
On July 16, it was announced that PK Carsport will field a third car for Dylan Derdaele and Pol van Pollaert for the final two race weeks of the season at Hockenheim and Zolder. Originally numbered #999, it was later changed to #98 when the Entry List for Hockenheim was released.
On July 22, it was announced that Guillaume Deflandre will made his Elite 1 debut for Dexwet-df1 Racing for the rounds at Hockenheim and Zolder and is currently working for a full-time return in the 2020 season.

Rule changes
General Tire will replace BFGoodrich as the official tire supplier on a six-year contract starting from 2019.
On 3 January 2019, NASCAR announced a series of Whelen Euro Series rule changes for 2019.
A maximum of 20 slick tires will be allocated to each driver for all qualifying and race session. Tires used during practice sessions and wet-weather tires will not be counted towards the 20 tire limit.
Teams will use a new three-way shock absorber that were developed by Team FJ.
A new rear spoiler design, made from transparent polycarbonate and steel, will be used. The new spoiler is also designed to give drivers better visibility.
An enhanced technical inspection process system, with support from NASCAR R&D Center, will be used on all races.
Elite 2's first qualifying session will have its time increased from 10 minutes to 20 minutes, while the time given at the Superpole qualifying session for Elite 2 weren't changed. All Elite 1 qualifying sessions will have the same amount of time as in previous seasons.

Schedule
NASCAR released the provisional calendar on 2 November 2018.

Elite 1

Elite 2

Calendar changes
NASCAR Euro Series will expand its calendar by adding Autodrom Most as the fourth round for the 2019 season. The races are scheduled to be held on 29 and 30 June.
Raceway Venray returns to the series after being absent from the calendar in 2018. Unlike the previous events, only one race is going to be held for both classes, with a 75-lap Elite 2 race scheduled for 13 July while a 100-lap Elite 1 race is scheduled for the following day. The Elite 2 race was later shortened into a 70-lap race.
An All-Star event titled the "All-Star Time Attack" is initially scheduled to be held at a street circuit in the city of Chinon on 22 and 23 June. This was later revealed to be an exhibition event that will be run as part of the annual Chinon Classic car meet.
All Elite 1 races, with the exception of the Elite 1 Venray round, will have its total race distance increased by 15 kilometers.

Results

Elite 1

Elite 2

Standings

Points are awarded to drivers and team using the current point system used in Monster Energy NASCAR Cup Series, NASCAR Xfinity Series, and NASCAR Gander Outdoors Truck Series, excluding the Stage and Race Winner bonus points. For the final two races in Hockenheim and Zolder, double points are awarded. In addition, the driver that gained the most positions in a race will receive bonus championship points. Should a driver competes in all 9 races between Valencia and Venray, then only the best 8 results of those 9 races were counted towards the Championship.

Elite 1

(key) Bold - Pole position awarded by fastest qualifying time (in Race 1) or by previous race's fastest lap (in Race 2). Italics - Fastest lap. * – Most laps led.  ^ – Most positions gained.

Notes
1 – Christophe Bouchut received no championship points during the Most weekend.
2 – Eric De Doncker received 5 championship points despite being a non-starter.
3 – Julio Carayol Casas received 1 championship point for non-starting a race despite withdrawing from the Valencia race meeting.

Elite 2

(key) Bold - Pole position awarded by fastest qualifying time (in Race 1) or by previous race's fastest lap (in Race 2). Italics - Fastest lap. * – Most laps led.  ^ – Most positions gained.

Notes
1 – The points scored by Moreno di Silvestre at Franciacorta was initially credited to Meisam Taheri in the championship, despite Taheri didn't take part in any of the races at Franciacorta. This inaccuracy was later rectified at Hockenheim, where the points from Franciacorta were correctly credited to di Silvestre in the post-race point standings.
2 – Eric De Doncker and Jennifer Jo Cobb received 0 championship points despite being a non-starter.

Team's Championship (Top 15)

See also

2019 Monster Energy NASCAR Cup Series
2019 NASCAR Xfinity Series
2019 NASCAR Gander Outdoors Truck Series
2019 ARCA Menards Series
2019 NASCAR K&N Pro Series East
2019 NASCAR K&N Pro Series West
2019 NASCAR Whelen Modified Tour
2019 NASCAR Pinty's Series
2019 NASCAR PEAK Mexico Series

Notes

References

NASCAR Whelen Euro Series seasons
NASCAR Whelen Euro Series
2019 in NASCAR